Agelena longipes is a species of spider in the family Agelenidae, which contains at least 1,350 species of funnel-web spiders . It was first described by Carpenter, 1900. It is primarily found in England.

References

longipes
Spiders of Europe
Spiders described in 1900